The Danielle Downey Credit Union Classic was an event on the Symetra Tour, the LPGA's developmental tour. It a part of the Symetra Tour's schedule from 2015 to 2021. It aws held at Brook-Lea Country Club, designed by Donald Ross, outside Rochester, New York.

The tournament was created to honor the legacy of Danielle Downey a native of the Rochester area who played on the LPGA Tour and died in 2014. Prior to the Danielle Downey Classic, Rochester was home to the LPGA Tour's Wegmans LPGA for more than thirty years. The tournament was a 72-hole event, unlike most Symetra Tour tournaments which are 54-holes.

Winners

External links
Official site
 Coverage on Symetra website

Former Symetra Tour events
Golf in New York (state)
Sports in Rochester, New York
Recurring sporting events established in 2015
Recurring sporting events disestablished in 2021
2015 establishments in New York (state)
2021 disestablishments in New York (state)